V. Doraswamy Raju ( 1946 – 18 January 2021) was an Indian film producer, distributor, and politician. He produced and distributed several Telugu films under his banner VMC Productions. He served as a Member of the Legislative Assembly from the Telugu Desam Party representing Nagari constituency, Andhra Pradesh between 1994 and 1999. He won two Nandi Awards and two Filmfare Awards.

Early life 
Doraswamy Raju was born in Chittoor district of Andhra Pradesh in a family of farmers. He was married and has a son.

Career

Films 
Raju started VMC Productions in 1978, which was launched by actor-politician N. T. Rama Rao.  His first film as a producer was Kirai Dada (1987), starring Nagarjuna. He later went on to produce successful films such as Seetharamayya Gari Manavaralu (1991), President Gari Pellam (1992), Madhavayya Gari Manavadu (1992), Annamayya (1997), and Simhadri (2003).

In addition to production, he was also involved in film distribution in Rayalaseema. He has distributed over 750 films, giving him nickname "Rayalaseema Raju."

Politics 
Raju began his political career in the early 1990s. He was elected as a Member of the Legislative Assembly from Nagari constituency in 1994. He contested the Telugu Desam Party ticket and defeated the Indian National Congress candidate R. Chenga Reddy. He also held positions such as member of TTD Board and president of Andhra Pradesh Film Chamber among others.

Death 
Raju died on 18 January 2021 at a private hospital in Banjara Hills, Hyderabad after suffering a cardiac arrest. He was 74. Filmmakers such as S. S. Rajamouli, Aswani Dutt, and Murali Mohan paid last respects to Raju.

Filmography 

 Kirai Dada (1987)
 Seetharamayya Gari Manavaralu (1991)
 President Gari Pellam (1992)
 Madhavayya Gari Manavadu (1992)
 Annamayya (1997)
 English Pellam East Godavari Mogudu (1999)
 Simhadri (2003) - as presenter
 Konchem Touchlo Vunte Cheputanu (2005)
 Vengamamba (2009)
 Uyyale (2009)
 Sri Vasavi Vaibhavam (2012)
 Vijeta (2016)

Awards 

 Filmfare Awards

 1991: Best Film – Telugu – Seetharamayya Gari Manavaralu
 1997: Best Film – Telugu - Annamayya

 Nandi Awards

 1991: Second Best Feature Film - Silver – Seetharamayya Gari Manavaralu
 1997: Best Feature Film - Gold - Annamayya

 Cinema Express Awards

 1991: Best Film – Seetharamayya Gari Manavaralu

References

External links 

 

2021 deaths
Telugu film producers
Film producers from Andhra Pradesh
People from Chittoor district
Andhra Pradesh politicians
Telugu Desam Party politicians
Andhra Pradesh MLAs 1994–1999
Filmfare Awards South winners
Nandi Award winners
Telugu politicians
1946 births